Prisoner of Love is the sixth studio album by American musician James Brown. The album was released in September 1963, by King Records.

Track listing

References

1963 albums
James Brown albums
Albums produced by James Brown
King Records (United States) albums